Palaiya Jumma Palli or Meen Kadai Palli is a mosque in Kilakarai, Tamil Nadu, India. Built in 628–630 AD, it is believed to be one of the oldest mosques in the world and along with Cheraman Juma Masjid in Kodungallur, Kerala and Barwada Mosque in Ghogha, Gujarat, the first mosque in India. It has an Islamic heritage of more than 1000 years. It is located in Kilakarai, an ancient port town in the South Indian state of Tamil Nadu known for its Islamic culture. It was built in 628–630 AD and was re-constructed in 1036. The mosque, along with the others in the town, is one of the greatest examples of Dravidian Islam architecture.

History and construction
Constructed by the Yemeni merchants and trade settlers of the pre-Islamic period in Pandiya kingdom ordered by Baadhan (Bazan ibn Sasan) Governor of Yemen at the time of Prophet Muhammad, after they accepted Islam in 625–628 AD at the time of Kavadh II son of Khosrau II (king of Persia). This mosque was rebuilt in the 11th century after saheed war. It is one of the oldest mosques of India. Bazan Ibn Sasan, Tamim Ibn zayd al ansari, Ibnu Batutah, Nagoor Abdul Cadir, Ervadi Ibrahim Sahib, Sultan of Ottoman Murad and other most famous Islamic scholars visited the mosque and Ibn Battuta said in his travel notes "the people there lived as though they were in the Arab land".

Structure 
The mosque architecture looks like a temple architecture, but does not have any idol carving on the pillars or walls. There is the Mihrab on the wall of inner Masjid which is unique identification of mosques for identifying the direction of prayer towards kaaba, mihrab of this mosque was exactly towards kaaba it's also proof of early navigation system followed here. the name 'pallavasal' means worship place with many door access, which is the tamil name of the mosque.

Gallery

See also
 Kilakarai
 Kilakarai Moors
 Arwi
 Bazan Ibn Sasan
 List of mosques in India
 List of the oldest mosques in the world

References

Mosques in Tamil Nadu
7th-century mosques
Religious buildings and structures completed in 1036
Ramanathapuram district
Palaiya
Mosques completed in 630
11th-century mosques